Chilkat weaving is a traditional form of weaving practiced by Tlingit, Haida, Tsimshian, and other Northwest Coast peoples of Alaska and British Columbia. Chilkat robes are worn by high-ranking tribal members on civic or ceremonial occasions, including dances.

Background

The name derives from the Tlingit people of the Chilkat (Jilkháat) region near Klukwan, Alaska on the Chilkat River. The Nisga'a are reputed to have invented the technique, according to some Tlingit weavers, though this is not attested in Tsimshian sources. Chilkat weaving can be applied to blankets, robes, dance tunics, aprons, leggings, shirts, vests, bags, hats, and wall-hangings. Chilkat clothing features long wool fringe that sways when the wearer dances. Traditionally chiefs would wear Chilkat robes during potlatch ceremonies.

Chilkat weaving is one of the most complex weaving techniques in the world. It is unique in that the artist can create curvilinear and circular forms within the weave itself. A Chilkat robe can take a year to weave. Traditionally mountain goat wool, dog fur, and yellow cedar bark are used in Chilkat weaving. Today sheep wool might be used. The designs used Northwest Coast formlines, a traditional aesthetic language made up of ovoid, U-form, and S-form elements to create highly stylized, but representational, clan crests and figures from oral history—often animals and especially their facial features. Yellow and black are dominant colors in the weavings, as is the natural buff color of the undyed wool. Blue can be a secondary color.
Looms used in Chilkat weaving only have a top frame and vertical supports, with no bottom frame, so the warp threads hang freely. The weaver works in vertical sections, as opposed to moving horizontally from end to end. Consequently, many designs are broken into vertical columns. As with most Northwest Coast art, these columns are bilaterally symmetrical.

Revival

In the 1990s, only an estimated six people still practiced true Chilkat weaving, but today the technique is enjoying a revival. Kaagwaantaan Clan, Ghooch Hít woman Jennie Thlunaut (1891–1986) was a celebrated Chilkat weaver, whose knowledge of formline design was so thorough, she was able to create her own designs following the traditional rules. Thlunaut trained Ghaanaxhteidí Clan woman Anna Brown Ehlers and T’akhdeintaan Clan woman  Clarissa Lampe [Hudson] Rizal (1956-2016). Rizal and others worked to train a new generation of weavers, and since that time more individuals have begun weaving in the Tlingit, Haida, and Tsimshian communities.

These tribes also create Ravenstail weavings and button blankets.

See also
 Lily Hope
 Ursala Hudson
 Clarissa Rizal
 Jennie Thlunaut
 Northwest Coast art
 Native American art

Notes

References
 
 
 
Jones, Zachary R. (2019). “A Life Painted in Yarn: A Biography of Tlingit Chilkat Weaver Clara Newman Benson.” Alaska History Vol. 34, no. 2 (Fall 2019): 26-43.

External links

 
 

Northwest Coast art
Culture of the Pacific Northwest
Weaving
Haida
Tlingit culture
Tsimshian
Indigenous textile art of the Americas